Syntonarcha vulnerata is a moth in the family Crambidae. It was described by Thomas Pennington Lucas in 1894. It is found in Australia where it has been recorded from Queensland and New South Wales.

References

Moths described in 1894
Odontiinae